Stiriini is a tribe of owlet moths in the family Noctuidae. There are about 16 genera and more than 90 described species in Stiriini.

Stiriini was formerly a tribe of the subfamily Amphipyrinae. As a result of phylogenetic research published in 2019, the tribe Stiriini was determined to be polyphyletic, with much of its diversity spread among three subfamilies. One of the three subfamilies was the existing family Metoponiinae. The other two subfamilies, Grotellinae and Stiriinae, were previously subtribes of Stiriini and were elevated to subfamily rank. Stiriini is now a tribe of the new subfamily Stiriinae, and contains the majority of the former subtribe Stiriina, along with a few other genera.

The moths of Stiriini are found in North America and, to a lesser extent, Central America and the Caribbean.

Genera
These 16 genera belong to the tribe Stiriini:

 Angulostiria Poole, 1995
 Argentostiria Poole, 1995
 Basilodes Guenée, 1852
 Bistica Dyar, 1912
 Chalcopasta Hampson, 1908
 Chrysoecia Hampson, 1908
 Cirrhophanus Grote, 1872
 Cuahtemoca Hogue, 1963
 Eulithosia H. Edwards, 1884
 Hoplolythrodes Poole, 1995
 Lineostriastiria Poole, 1995
 Narthecophora Smith, 1900
 Neumoegenia Grote, 1882
 Plagiomimicus Grote, 1873
 Stiria Grote, 1874
 Xanthothrix H. Edwards, 1878

References

Further reading

External links

 

Amphipyrinae